Eucereon rosina is a moth of the subfamily Arctiinae. It was described by Francis Walker in 1854. It is found in Mexico, Venezuela, Trinidad and Rio de Janeiro, Brazil.

References

 

rosina
Moths described in 1854